Hiram Lawton Richmond (May 17, 1810 – February 19, 1885) was a Republican member of the U.S. House of Representatives from Pennsylvania.

Hiram L. Richmond was born in Chautauqua, New York.  He received his early education from a private instructor and in the common schools.  He studied medicine two years with his father.  He attended Allegheny College in Meadville, Pennsylvania, in 1834 and 1835 but did not graduate.  He studied law, was admitted to the bar in 1838 and commenced the practice of law in Meadville.  In early manhood was a staunch Whig but united with the Republican Party upon its organization.

Richmond was elected as a Republican to the Forty-third Congress.  He was not a candidate for renomination in 1874.  He served as a member of the board of trustees of Allegheny College for many years.  He resumed the practice of law, and died in Meadville in 1885.  Interment in Greendale Cemetery.

Sources

The Political Graveyard

External links 
 
 

Pennsylvania lawyers
1810 births
1885 deaths
Republican Party members of the United States House of Representatives from Pennsylvania
People from Chautauqua, New York
19th-century American politicians
Burials at Greendale Cemetery
19th-century American lawyers